A Sawyer motor or planar motor (also called area drive) is a multi-coordinate drive that can perform several independent movements in one plane. Goods can be transported along any path to any location. In the industrial environment, the planar motor replaces cross tables in machine tools, for example. This class of motors is named for Bruce Sawyer, who invented it in 1968.

Operating principles 
The planar motor is a driver/guideless drive system. The planar motor consists of a flat base element ("stator") made of tiles and carriages ("movers") arranged on it. The latter are equipped with mostly cuboid magnets whose magnetization is perpendicular to the plane and which are controlled in the X and Y directions with alternating polarity. The movement of the slides themselves is achieved by further magnets arranged parallel to the plane, thus allowing the slides to move in the X and Z directions. The number and arrangement of magnets perpendicular and parallel to the base determines the degrees of freedom and positioning accuracy.

The operating principle of the planar motor can be traced back to Bruce Sawyer, which is why it is also known as the Sawyer motor. The U.S. engineer applied for a patent for a "Magnetic Positioning Device" in 1966, which was confirmed in 1968.

Application area 
Planar motors are mainly used for handling products in individual machines or in machine lines. They combine the dynamics of conventional linear transport systems with magnetic fabric technology, which enables individual and decoupled product transport. In addition, there is the traceability.

Since there is no mechanical connection between the base surface and the carriage, planar motors are characterized by minimal maintenance and cleaning requirements. The cover of the base surface can also be made of stainless steel, glass, or plastic, for example, to protect it from leakage of liquids or cleaning processes.

See also 
 Linear motor
 Tubular linear motor

References 

Electric motors
Linear motion